The 2019 ICF Canoe Marathon World Championships took place between 17 and 20 October 2019 in Shaoxing, China. The competition consisted of twenty-one events – twelve in kayak and nine in canoe – shared between junior, under-23 and senior categories.

Medalists

Seniors

Under 23

Juniors

Medal table

References

External links
 ICF site
 Results site

ICF Canoe Marathon World Championships
World Championships
2019 in Chinese sport
International sports competitions hosted by China
Canoeing in China
ICF